Tilisolol (INN, trade name Selecal) is a beta blocker.

References 

Beta blockers
Lactams
Isoquinolines
Phenol ethers
Secondary alcohols
Amines
Tert-butyl compounds